Maximus the Greek, also known as Maximos the Greek or Maksim Grek (–1556), was a Greek monk, publicist, writer, scholar, and translator active in Russia. He is also called Maximos the Hagiorite, as well as Maximus the Philosopher. His signature was Maximus Grecus Lakedaimon (lit. Maximus the Greek of, and originating from, Lakedaimonia) and his family origins were probably from Mystras, a location in Laconia, which was the geographical site of Ancient Sparta in the Peloponnese.

Early years
Maximus was born Michael Trivolis  in Arta, then in the Ottoman Empire, the scion of a noble Greek family with ties to the Byzantine emperor in Constantinople, and originating from Sparta. Both Maximus's parents were Christian Greeks; his mother was Irene and his father, Manuel, was a voivode. Irene and Manuel left Constantinople together for Arta and the latter may have been a Byzantine military governor of Arta before the city fell to the Ottomans in 1449.

Demetrios Trivolis, Manuel's brother and Maximus's uncle, was a Greek scribe who self-identified as "a Peloponnesian from Sparta". In 1461–1462, Demetrios reproduced a manuscript of Plato's Timaeus while in Corfu and in 1465, he copied Plotinus's Enneads while in Crete; after his completion of Plato's work, Demetrius wrote the following note: "" which translates as: "The present book was written by my own hand of Demetrios Trivolis Peloponnesian from Sparta who made these works in the island of the Kerkyreans after the fall of our fatherland" (referencing the fall of his native Laconia to the Ottomans). In another note, Demetrios writes: "" which translates as: "This most beautiful book of mine is property of Demetrios Trivolis Peloponnesian from Sparta. I bought it after the fall of our fatherland Lacedaemonia, which was once fortunate." The Trivolis family was later associated with the Palaiologos dynasty in Mystras.

Maximus studied on the island of Corfu under the supervision of John Moschos and John Lascaris and later went with Lascaris to Florence (in 1492 or 1493) and continued his studies in Bologna, Florence, Ferrara, Milan, Padua, and Venice. While in Italy, he studied ancient languages, as well as ecclesiastic and philosophic works (especially Neoplatonism). He knew prominent figures of the Renaissance era such as the Venetian printer Aldus Manutius and made the acquaintance of scholars Angelo Poliziano, Marsilio Ficino, Pico della Mirandola, Scipio Callerges, and Fonteguerri. Maximus was also greatly influenced by the preachings of the fiery Dominican priest and reformer Girolamo Savonarola whose ashes he gathered in 1498.

Career
In 1504 (according to other accounts, 1505 or early 1506), Maximus left the Dominican monastery of St. Mark and went to Mount Athos where he took monastic vows at the Monastery of Vatopedi in 1507. In 1515, Grand Prince Vasili III asked the abbot of the monastery to send him a certain monk by the name of Savva to translate a number of religious texts. Savva was so old that the abbot decided to send the energetic Maximus instead, though he had no knowledge of the Church Slavonic language. Nevertheless, the monks vouched for him, and he went to Moscow, where he was met with great honor. Upon arriving in Moscow in 1518, Maximus headed the movement of religious reform. In 1518, Maximus met Prince Kurbskii, who later wrote about Maximus and his time in Moscow in Skazanie o Maksime Filosofe (The Tale of Maxim the Philosopher). In this work, Kurbskii describes a meeting between Maximus and Vasili III whereupon Maximus was astonished at the countless multitudes of Greek books displayed at Vasili III's court. Maximus assured the Prince that he had never seen so many Greek works in Greece itself. This testimony is the earliest known reference of a collection of ancient manuscripts belonging to the Russian Tsars which has never been found, also referred to as The Lost Library of the Moscow Tsars. This lost library later became a favorite research topic of early twentieth century Russian archaeologist Ignatius Stelletskii.

Assignment to Moscow
Maximus's first major work in Russia was a translation of the Psalter together with the Russian translators (including the scholar Dmitry Gerasimov) and scriveners, which would be solemnly approved by the Russian clergy and the grand prince himself. After Vasili III rejected his request to go home, Maximus continued to work on translations and correcting the books for divine service. Observing the "defects" and injustices of Muscovite life, which seemed to him in direct opposition to his Christian ideals, Maximus began to expose them and criticize the authorities, attracting different people with similar views, such as Ivan Bersen-Beklemishev, Vassian Patrikeyev, and others. With regards to the question of monastic estates, which had already divided the Russian clergy into two antagonistic camps (the Possessors and the Non-Possessors), Maximus took sides with Nilus of Sors and his startsy, who headed the Non-Possessors camp. This would make him one of the worst enemies of the Josephites, who stood for the right of the monasteries to own land. Maximus and his followers discussed freely the shortcomings of Russia's internal and foreign policies, criticized the lifestyle of the Russian clergy, exploitation of peasants, and the system of supporting local authorities by "milking" the peasants (the so-called кормление, or kormleniye).

Imprisonment

Maximus's relations with Vassian Patrikeyev, Ivan Bersen-Beklemishev, and Turkish ambassador Skinder, Metropolitan Daniel's hostility towards him, and Greek's own negative attitude towards Vasili III's intention to divorce Solomonia Saburova decided his fate. A sobor in 1525 accused Maximus of nonconformism and heresy based on his views and translations of ecclesiastic books, disregarding his incomplete knowledge of Russian and obvious mistakes on the part of the Russian scriveners (his improper use of the imperfect tense was used to imply that he no longer believed the Holy Spirit was the Third Person of the Trinity but only had been temporarily). He was then exiled to the Joseph-Volokolamsk Monastery and placed in a dungeon without the right to take communion or correspond. Maximus's "irritating" behavior at the monastery, newly discovered mistakes in his translations, and old suspicions of his unscrupulous relations with the now dead Turkish ambassador were all used against him once again at a new sobor in 1531. Worn out by the harsh conditions of his imprisonment, Maximus acknowledged some minor mistakes in his translations and excessive wine drinking. Finally, the sobor banned him from receiving communion and exiled him to the Otroch Monastery in Tver, where he would spend his next twenty years. The Patriarch of Antioch, Patriarch of Constantinople, and Patriarch of Jerusalem all attempted to negotiate Maximus's release with the Russian authorities, but to no avail. He himself pleaded with Ivan the Terrible (r. 1547–1584) and Metropolitan Macarius for his freedom. Moscow was afraid of Maximus's ability to expose wrongdoings and criticize the powers that be and, therefore, was reluctant to let him go. In 1551 (or 1553 according to other accounts), Maximus was transferred to the Troitse-Sergiyeva Lavra at the solicitation of some boyars and Hegumen Artemiy of the lavra. That same year, according to some accounts, the tsar is said to have visited Maximus during his pilgrimage to Kirillo-Belozersky Monastery; Maximus is described as having advised the ruler to take care of the families of soldiers who died in the conquest of Kazan instead of merely praying for the dead. In 1554, Maximus was invited to join a sobor, which would deal with the heresy of Matvei Bashkin, but he refused, being wary of getting entangled in this case.

Death
Maximus died in 1556 in Troitse-Sergiyeva Lavra, Sergiyev Posad. He is buried in the Refectory Church in the Lavra.

Legacy

Maximus left a voluminous body of original writings and translations into Russian Church Slavonic. He spent a great deal of energy and ink in his efforts to prove his innocence and Orthodoxy. He interpreted and explained for his Muscovite readers a large number of points of ancient and Biblical history, Orthodox Church practice and teachings, and features of the contemporary world outside of Muscovy. For example, he was the first to bring the discovery of the New World to the attention of Muscovite readers. He is considered a saint by the Eastern Orthodox Church, which commemorates him on 21 January.

References

Citations

Sources

Further reading

External links

1475 births
1556 deaths
16th-century Greek people
16th-century Christian saints
Greek saints of the Eastern Orthodox Church
Eastern Catholic saints
People of the Grand Duchy of Moscow
Russian religious leaders
Greek Christian monks
Greek Renaissance humanists
People from Arta, Greece
Greek emigrants to Russia
16th-century Greek educators
15th-century Greek educators
15th-century Greek writers
16th-century Greek writers
16th-century male writers
People associated with Mount Athos
People associated with Vatopedi